Shootout in a One-Dog Town is a 1974 American Western television film produced by Hanna-Barbera Productions starring Richard Crenna and Stefanie Powers and directed by Burt Kennedy. It was originally written by Larry Cohen and rewritten by others. The film was broadcast as the ABC Movie of the Week on January 9, 1974.

Plot
A mortally-wounded courier (Michael Ansara) arrives in a small town, and asks the town banker (Richard Crenna) to safeguard the valuable shipment which he has given his life to protect. Crenna agrees to do so, much to the chagrin of the townspeople who fear that the vicious gang of bad guys will now tear up the town to finally get their hands on the $200,000 stored in his bank.

Cast
 Richard Crenna as Zack Wells
 Stefanie Powers as Letty Crandell
 Jack Elam as Handy
 Arthur O'Connell as Henry Gills
 Michael Ansara as Reynolds
 Dub Taylor as Halsey
 Gene Evans as Gabe
 Michael Anderson Jr. as Billy Boy
 Richard Egan as Petry

References

External links
 
 
 

1974 television films
1974 Western (genre) films
American Western (genre) television films
ABC Movie of the Week
Films directed by Burt Kennedy
Films scored by Hoyt Curtin
Hanna-Barbera films
1970s English-language films